Dedik Setiawan (born 27 June 1994) is an Indonesian professional footballer who plays as a forward for Liga 1 club Arema and the Indonesia national team. Dedik plays mainly as a striker, but he has also been deployed as a wide forward.

Club career

Early career
In 2011, he joined Persekam Metro junior, who at that time drove him in the team Porprov Malang regency. and in 2016, he was loaned for joined by Arema to take part in a test match against Cepu All Star on 15 October 2016. He scored twice and carried Arema to a 3–2 victory.

Arema
In 2016, Dedik registered to the selection player of Arema. Club was looking for a backup striker at the time. He was recruited and joined Arema in the second round of 2016 Indonesia Soccer Championship A. He made his first-team debut for Arema in the 2016 Indonesia Soccer Championship A match against Perseru Serui on 13 November 2016, which Arema lost 0–1. Where he coming in the 65th minute replacing Febri Setiadi Hamzah. He made his first goal for Arema came in a 2–0 win against Bhayangkara at home in the 2017 Liga 1. On 2019 league season, he experienced anterior cruciate ligament injury which affected to his current not optimal performance in the match. Before his injury, Dedik known as on of decent striker.

International career 
He made his debut for Indonesia on 11 September 2018 in a friendly against Mauritius as a substitute.

Career statistics

Club

International appearances

Honours

Club
Arema
 Indonesia President's Cup: 2017, 2019, 2022

International
Indonesia
 AFF Championship runner-up: 2020

References

External links
 
 

1994 births
Living people
Indonesian footballers
People from Malang
Sportspeople from East Java
Sportspeople from Malang
Persekam Metro players
Liga 2 (Indonesia) players
Arema F.C. players
Liga 1 (Indonesia) players
Association football wingers
Association football forwards
Indonesia international footballers